Lyctus or Lyttos (Greek:  or ), was one of the most considerable cities in ancient Crete, which appears in the Homeric catalogue. Lyttos is now a village in the municipality of Minoa Pediada.

Lyctus in mythology
According to Hesiod, Theogony (477-484), Rhea gave birth to Zeus in Lyctus and hid him in a cave of Mount Aegaeon. The inhabitants of this ancient Doric city called themselves colonists of Sparta, and the worship of Apollo appears to have prevailed there.

History
According to Polybius, Lyctus was the oldest city on Crete.

In the Mortuary Temple of Amenhotep III (1391–1353 BC), there is a list of Aegean place names; Lyctus is mentioned under the name Rikata.

According to some scholars, the name was mentioned in Linear B texts as ru-ki-to.

In 344 BC, Phalaecus the Phocis assisted the Knossians against their neighbors the Lyctians, and took the city of Lyctus, from which he was driven out by Archidamus, king of Sparta. The Lyctians, at a still later period, were engaged in frequent hostilities with Knossos, and succeeded in creating a formidable party in the island against that city. During the Lyttian War in 220 BC the Knossians, taking advantage of their absence on a distant expedition, surprised Lyctus, and utterly destroyed it. The citizens, on their return, abandoned it, and found refuge at Lappa. Polybius, on this occasion, bears testimony to the high character of the Lyctians, as compared with their countrymen. They afterwards recovered their city by the aid of the Gortynians, who gave them a place called Diatonium, which they had taken from the Knossians.

Lyctus was sacked by the Roman general Metellus, but was existing in the time of Strabo at a distance of 80 stadia (15 km) from the Libyan Sea. The site still bears the name of Lytto, where ancient remains are now found.

In the 16th century, Venetian manuscripts describe the walls of the ancient city, with circular bastions, and other fortifications, as existing upon a lofty mountain, nearly in the centre of the island. Numerous vestiges of ancient structures, tombs, and broken marbles, are seen, as well as an immense arch of an aqueduct, by which the water was carried across a deep valley by means of a large marble channel.

The harbor of Chersonesos served as the port for Lyctus trade.

The town of Arsinoe belonged to Lyctos during the Hellenistic period, according to Stephanus of Byzantium, although its location is far from certain. Some scholars locate this Arsinoe (Crete) at the site of the older city of Rhithymna (although it is rather far from Lyctos). Others place it near the village of Malia, at Chersonesos above, or elsewhere in the territory of Lyctos.

The decoration of the coins issued at Lyctus is usually an eagle flying, with the inscription "ΛΥΤΤΙΩΝ" ("of the Lyttians").

Modern history
Before unearthing Knossos, Arthur Evans intended to excavate Lyttos but did not succeed in obtaining the necessary permits. As of 2022, only a small part of the site has been systematically excavated. A new five-year research program commenced in 2021, whose first year yielded significant findings the most important of which was a headless marble statue of Hadrian.

References

Cretan city-states
Former populated places in Greece
Spartan colonies
Apollo
Populated places in Heraklion (regional unit)